The bisphenols are a group of chemical compounds related to diphenylmethane. Most are based on two hydroxyphenyl functional groups linked by a methylene bridge. Exceptions include bisphenol S, P, and M. "Bisphenol" is a common name; the letter following denotes the variant, which depends on the additional substituents. Bisphenol A is the most popular representative of the group, often simply called "bisphenol".

List

Health effects
Bisphenols A (BPA), F (BPF) and S (BPS) have been shown to be endocrine disruptors. Due to its high production volumes, BPA has been characterised as a "pseudo-persistent" chemical, leading to its spreading and potential accumulation in a variety of environmental matrices, even though it has a fairly short half-life.

References

 For additional examples and alternate names, see: 

 
Endocrine disruptors